Roberto Martínez (born 10 July 1938) is a Uruguayan boxer. He competed in the men's welterweight event at the 1960 Summer Olympics. At the 1960 Summer Olympics, he lost to Max Meier of Switzerland.

References

1938 births
Living people
Uruguayan male boxers
Olympic boxers of Uruguay
Boxers at the 1960 Summer Olympics
People from Rocha Department
Welterweight boxers